Portrait of Philibert Rivière is a c. 1805 oil on canvas painting by the French Neoclassical artist Jean-Auguste-Dominique Ingres. It was commissioned by Philibert Rivière de L'Isle, an influential court official in the Napoleonic Empire, along with portraits of his wife, Philibert and their daughter, Caroline.

The couple also has a son, Paul, who was not portrayed. The three portraits comprised Ingres' first major commission, were completed when he was c 23 years old. They are each very different in tone and approach, but were highly successful from an artistic point of view, and all considered among his early masterpieces.

Description

As an official commission, the painting is very different from Ingres' earlier male portraits, which were mostly informal descriptions of friends. Philibert is shown in an official pose, sitting on a highly ornate and expensive chair, and posed beside a table draped with a red velvet cloth, and containing documents related to his office. His hand is tucked inside his vest, in a pose reminiscent of Napoleon.

The painting was influences by the work of Jacques-Louis David, in particular his amiable portraits of Pierre Sériziat and Gaspar Mayer. Here Rivière may appear imposing, while also relaxed and friendly. The painting is very flat and spatially restrictive.

Unusually for Ingres, there are no surviving preparatory sketches. The artist signed and dated the canvas at the lower left.

Notes

Sources

Rosenblum, Robert. Ingres. London: Harry N. Abrams, 1990. 
Conisbee, Philip. Portraits by Ingres: Image of an Epoch. New York: Metropolitan Museum of Art, 1999. 

Portraits by Jean-Auguste-Dominique Ingres
1805 paintings